A bar, also known as a saloon, a tavern  or tippling house, or sometimes as a pub or club, is a retail  business establishment that serves alcoholic beverages, such as beer, wine, liquor, cocktails, and other beverages such as mineral water and soft drinks. Bars often also sell snack foods, such as crisps or peanuts, for consumption on their premises. Some types of bars, such as pubs, may also serve food from a restaurant menu. The term "bar" refers to the countertop where drinks are prepared and served, and by extension to the overall premises.  

The term derives from the metal or wooden bar (barrier) that is often located along the length of the "bar". Over many years, heights of bars were lowered, and high stools added, and the brass bar remains today.

Bars provide stools or chairs that are placed at tables or counters for their patrons. Bars that offer entertainment or live music are often referred to as "music bars", "live venues", or "nightclubs". Types of bars range from inexpensive dive bars
to elegant places of entertainment, often accompanying restaurants for dining.

Many bars operate a discount period, designated a "happy hour" or discount of the day to encourage off-peak-time patronage. Bars that fill to capacity sometimes implement a cover charge or a minimum drink-purchase requirement during their peak hours. Bars may have bouncers to ensure that patrons are of legal age, to eject drunk or belligerent patrons, and to collect cover charges. Such bars often feature entertainment, which may be a live band, vocalist, comedian, or disc jockey playing recorded music.

Patrons may sit or stand at the counter and be served by a bartender. Depending on the size of a bar and its approach, alcohol may be served at the bar by bartenders, at tables by servers, or by a combination of the two. The "back bar" is a set of shelves of glasses and bottles behind the counter. In some establishments, the back bar is elaborately decorated with woodwork, etched glass, mirrors, and lights.

History

There have been many different names for public drinking spaces throughout history. In the colonial era of the United States,   taverns were an important meeting place, as most other institutions were weak. During the 19th century saloons were very important to the leisure time of the working class. Today, even when an establishment uses a different name, such as "tavern" or "saloon" or, in the United Kingdom, a "pub", the area of the establishment where the bartender pours or mixes beverages is normally called "the bar".

The sale and/or consumption of alcoholic beverages was prohibited in the first half of the 20th century in several countries, including Finland, Iceland, Norway, and the United States. In the United States, illegal bars during Prohibition were called "speakeasies", "blind pigs", and "blind tigers".

Legal restrictions
Laws in many jurisdictions prohibit minors from entering a bar. If those under legal drinking age are allowed to enter, as is the case with pubs that serve food, they are not allowed to drink. In some jurisdictions, bars cannot serve a patron who is already intoxicated. Cities and towns usually have legal restrictions on where bars may be located and on the types of alcohol they may serve to their customers. Some bars may have a license to serve beer and wine, but not hard liquor. In some jurisdictions, patrons buying alcohol must also order food. In some jurisdictions, bar owners have a legal liability for the conduct of patrons who they serve (this liability may arise in cases of driving under the influence which cause injuries or deaths).

Many Islamic countries prohibit bars as well as the possession or sale of alcohol for religious reasons, while others, including Qatar and the United Arab Emirates, allow bars in some specific areas, but only permit non-Muslims to drink in them.

Types

A bar's owners and managers choose the bar's name, décor, drink menu, lighting, and other elements which they think will attract a certain kind of patron. However, they have only limited influence over who patronizes their establishment. Thus, a bar originally intended for one demographic profile can become popular with another. For example, a gay or lesbian bar with a dance or disco floor might, over time, attract an increasingly heterosexual clientele, or a blues bar may become a biker bar if most its patrons are bikers. Bars can also be an integral part of larger venues. For example, hotels, casinos and nightclubs are usually home to one or several bars.

A cocktail lounge is an upscale bar that is typically located within a hotel, restaurant or airport.

A full bar serves liquor, cocktails, wine, and beer.

A wine bar is a bar that focuses on wine rather than on beer or liquor. Patrons of these bars may taste wines before deciding to buy them. Some wine bars also serve small plates of food or other snacks.

A beer bar focuses on beer, particularly craft beer, rather than on wine or liquor. A brew pub has an on-site brewery and serves craft beers.

"Fern bar" is an American slang term for an upscale or preppy (or yuppie) bar.

A music bar is a bar that presents live music as an attraction, such as a piano bar.

A dive bar, often referred to simply as a "dive", is a very informal bar which may be considered by some to be disreputable.

A non-alcoholic bar is a bar that does not serve alcoholic beverages.

A strip club is a bar with nude entertainers.

A bar and grill is also a restaurant.

Some persons may designate either a room or an area of a room as a home bar. Furniture and arrangements vary from efficient to full bars that could be suited as businesses.

Entertainment

Bars categorized by the kind of entertainment they offer:
Arcade bars, in which the bar have video games on cabinets and consoles
Blues bars, specializing in the live blues style of music
Comedy bars, specializing in stand-up comedy entertainment
Dance bars, which have a dance floor where patrons dance to recorded music. Typically, if a venue has a large dance floor, focuses primarily on dancing rather than seated drinking, and hires professional DJs, it is considered to be a nightclub or discothèque rather than a bar.
Karaoke bars, with nightly karaoke as entertainment
Music bars, specializing in live music (i.e. concerts). Piano bars are one example.
Drag bars, which specialize in drag performances as entertainment
Salsa bars, where patrons dance to Latin salsa music
Sports bars, which are furnished with sports-related memorabilia and theming, and typically contain a large number of televisions used to broadcast major sporting events for their patrons.
A tiki bar offers a fully immersive and entertaining environment, including tropical cocktails, tiki carvings, exotica music, a dark, windowless space with light fixtures lending a soft glow, and nautical brick-a-brac that hints at romantic travels to exotic lands. 
Topless bars, where topless female employees dance or serve drinks. In India, these bars are called dance bars, which is distinct from the type of "dance bar" discussed above.

Patrons

Bars can categorized by the kind of patrons who frequent them:
Bicycle messenger bars, where bike messengers congregate; these are found only in cities with large bike messenger communities
Biker bars, which are bars frequented by motorcycle enthusiasts and (in some regions) motorcycle club members.
Cop bars, where off-duty law enforcement agents gather.
College bars, usually located in or near universities, where most of the patrons are students
Gay bars, where gay men or women dance and socialize
Hipster bars, where hipsters are the patrons of this bar
Lesbian bars
Neighborhood bars, a bar that most of the patrons know each other; it is generally close to home and is frequented regularly
"Old man" bars, whose clientele are mainly long-time male patrons who know each other well; since most patrons are retired, they often begin drinking much earlier in the day, consume inexpensive beer/whisky and may spend much of the day chatting, reading the newspaper, and watching television
Sailor bars, usually located in waterfront areas near commercial docks or naval bases
Singles bars where (mostly) unmarried people of both sexes can meet and socialize
Sports bars, where sports fans gather to cheer on their favorite teams with other like-minded fans. Sports bars generally have a dozen or more televisions, in order to display simultaneous games or sports
Women's bars

Bar (counter)

The counter at which drinks are served by a bartender is called "the bar". This term is applied, as a synecdoche, to drinking establishments called "bars". This counter typically stores a variety of beers, wines, liquors, and non-alcoholic ingredients, and is organized to facilitate the bartender's work.

Counters for serving other types of food and drink may also be called bars. Examples of this usage of the word include snack bars, sushi bars, juice bars, salad bars, dairy bars, and ice cream sundae bars.

Locations

Australia
In Australia, the major form of licensed commercial alcohol outlet from the colonial period to the present was the pub, a local variant of the English original. Until the 1970s, Australian pubs were traditionally organised into gender-segregated drinking areas—the "public bar" was only open to men, while the "lounge bar" or "saloon bar" served both men and women (i.e. mixed drinking). This distinction was gradually eliminated as anti-discrimination legislation and women's rights activism broke down the concept of a public drinking area accessible to only men. Where two bars still exist in the one establishment, one (that derived from the "public bar") will be more downmarket while the other (deriving from the "lounge bar") will be more upmarket. Over time, with the introduction of gaming machines into hotels, many "lounge bars" have or are being converted into gaming rooms.

Beginning in the mid-1950s, the formerly strict state liquor licensing laws were progressively relaxed and reformed, with the result that pub trading hours were extended. This was in part to eliminate the social problems associated with early closing times—notably the infamous "six o'clock swill"—and the thriving trade in "sly grog" (illicit alcohol sales). More licensed liquor outlets began to appear, including retail "bottle shops" (over-the-counter bottle sales were previously only available at pubs and were strictly controlled). Particularly in Sydney, a new class of licensed premises, the wine bar, appeared; there alcohol could be served on the proviso that it was provided in tandem with a meal. These venues became very popular in the late 1960s and early 1970s and many offered free entertainment, becoming an important facet of the Sydney music scene in that period.

In the major Australian cities today there is a large and diverse bar scene with a range of ambiences, modes and styles catering for every echelon of cosmopolitan society.

Canada
Public drinking began with the establishment of colonial taverns in both the U.S and Canada. While the term changed to Public house especially in the U.K., the term Tavern continued to be used instead of Pub in both the U.S and Canada.
Public drinking establishments were banned by the Prohibition of alcohol, which was (and is) a provincial jurisdiction. Prohibition was repealed, province by province in the 1920s. There was not a universal right to consume alcohol, and only males of legal age were permitted to do so. "Beer parlours" were common in the wake of prohibition, with local laws often not permitting entertainment (such as the playing of games or music) in these establishments, which were set aside for the purpose solely of consuming alcohol.

Since the end of the Second World War, and exposure by roughly one million Canadians to the public house traditions common in the UK by servicemen and women serving there, those traditions became more common in Canada. These traditions include the drinking of dark ales and stouts, the "pub" as a social gathering place for both sexes, and the playing of games (such as darts, snooker, or pool). The tavern became extremely popular during the 1960s and 1970s, especially for working-class people. Canadian taverns, which can still be found in remote regions of Northern Canada, have long tables with benches lining the sides. Patrons in these taverns often order beer in large quart bottles and drink inexpensive "bar brand" Canadian rye whisky. In some provinces, taverns used to have separate entrances for men and women. Even in a large city like Toronto, separate entrances existed into the early 1970s.

Canada has adopted some of the newer U.S. bar traditions (such as the "sports bar") of the last decades. As a result, the term "bar" has come to be differentiated from the term "pub", in that bars are usually 'themed' and sometimes have a dance floor. Bars with dance floors are usually relegated to small or Suburban communities. In larger cities bars with large dance floors are usually referred to as clubs and are strictly for dancing, Establishments that call themselves pubs are often much more similar to a British pub in style. Before the 1980s, most "bars" were referred to simply as "tavern".

Often, bars and pubs in Canada will cater to supporters of a local sporting team, usually a hockey team. There is a difference between the sports bar and the pub; sports bars focus on TV screens showing games and showcasing uniforms, equipment, etc. Pubs will generally also show games but do not exclusively focus on them. The Tavern was popular until the early 1980s, when American-style bars, as we know them today became popular. In the 1990s imitation British- and Irish-style pubs become popular and adopted names like "The Fox and Fiddle" and "The Queen and Beaver" reflect naming trends in Britain. Tavern or pub-style mixed food and drink establishments are generally more common than bars in Canada, although both can be found.

Legal restrictions on bars are set by the Canadian provinces and territories, which has led to a great deal of variety. While some provinces have been very restrictive with their bar regulation, setting strict closing times and banning the removal of alcohol from the premises, other provinces have been more liberal. Closing times generally run from 2:00 to 4:00 a.m.

In Nova Scotia, particularly in Halifax, there was, until the 1980s, a very distinct system of gender-based laws that were in effect for decades. Taverns, bars, halls, and other classifications differentiated whether it was exclusively for men or women, men with invited women, vice versa, or mixed. After this fell by the wayside, there was the issue of water closets. This led to many taverns adding on "powder rooms"; sometimes they were constructed later, or used parts of kitchens or upstairs halls if plumbing allowed. This was also true of conversions in former "sitting rooms", for men's facilities.

Italy

In Italy, a "bar" is a place more similar to a café, where people go during the morning or the afternoon, usually to drink a coffee, a cappuccino, or a hot chocolate and eat some kind of snack such as sandwiches (panini or tramezzini) or pastries. However, any kind of alcoholic beverages are served. Opening hours vary: some establishments are open very early in the morning and close relatively early in the evening; others, especially if next to a theater or a cinema, may be open until late at night. Many larger bars are also restaurants and disco clubs.
Many Italian bars have introduced a so-called "aperitivo" time in the evening, in which everyone who purchases an alcoholic drink then has free access to a usually abundant buffet of cold dishes such as pasta salads, vegetables, and various appetizers.

Poland

In modern Polish, in most cases a bar would be referred to as pub (plural puby), a loan from English. Polish puby serve various kinds of alcoholic drinks as well as other beverages and simple snacks such as crisps, peanuts or pretzel sticks. Most establishments feature loud music and some have frequent live performances. While Polish word bar can be also applied to this kind of establishment, it is often used to describe any kind of inexpensive restaurant, and therefore can be translated as diner or cafeteria. Both in bary and in puby, the counter at which one orders is called bar, itself being another obvious loanword from English.

Bar mleczny (literally 'milk bar') is a kind of inexpensive self-service restaurant serving wide range of dishes, with simple interior design, usually opened during breakfast and lunch hours. It is very similar to Russian столовая in both menu and decor. It can be also compared to what is called greasy spoon in English-speaking countries. Bary mleczne rarely serve alcoholic beverages.

The term bar szybkiej obsługi (lit. 'quick service restaurant') also refers to eating - not drinking - establishments. It is being gradually replaced by the English term fast food. Another name, bar samoobsługowy may be applied for any kind of self-service restaurant. Some kinds of Polish bar serve only one type of meal. An example are restaurants serving pasztecik szczeciński, a traditional specialty of the city of Szczecin. It can be consumed at the table or take-out.

Spain
Bars are common in Spain and form an important part in Spanish culture. In Spain, it is common for a town to have many bars and even to have several lined up on the same street. Most bars have a section of the street or plaza outside with tables and chairs with parasols if the weather allows it. Spanish bars are also known for serving a wide range of sandwiches (bocadillos), as well as snacks called tapas or pinchos.

Tapas and pinchos may be offered to customers in two ways, either complementary to order a drink or in some cases there are charged independently, either case this is usually clearly indicated to bar customers by display of wall information, on menus and price lists.
The anti-smoking law has entered in effect January 1, 2011 and since that date it is prohibited to smoke in bars and restaurants as well as all other indoor areas, closed commercial and state owned facilities are now smoke-free areas.

Spain is the country with the highest ratio of bars/population with almost six bars per thousand inhabitants, three times UK's ratio and four times Germany's. The meaning of the word 'bar' in Spain, however, does not have the negative connotation inherent in the same word in many other languages. For Spanish people a bar is essentially a meeting place, and not necessarily a place to engage in the consumption of alcoholic beverages. As a result, children are normally allowed into bars, and it is common to see families in bars during week-ends of the end of the day. In small towns, the 'bar' may constitute the very center of social life, and it is customary that, after social events, people go to bars, including seniors and children alike.

United Kingdom
In the UK, bars are either areas that serve alcoholic drinks within establishments such as hotels, restaurants, universities, or are a particular type of establishment which serves alcoholic drinks such as wine bars, "style bars", private membership only bars. However, the main type of establishment selling alcohol for consumption on the premises is the pub. Some bars are similar to nightclubs in that they feature loud music, subdued lighting, or operate a dress code and admissions policy, with inner city bars generally having door staff at the entrance.

'Bar' also designates a separate drinking area within a pub. Traditionally many pubs had two or more bars – very often the public bar or tap room and the saloon bar or lounge, where the decor was better and prices were sometimes higher. The designations of the bars varied regionally. In the last two decades, many pub interiors have been opened up into single spaces, which some people regret as it loses the flexibility, intimacy, and traditional feel of a multi-roomed public house.

One of the last dive bars in London was underneath the Kings Head Pub in Gerrard Street, Soho.

United States

In the United States, legal distinctions often exist between restaurants and bars, and even between types of bars. These distinctions vary from state to state, and even among municipalities. Beer bars (sometimes called taverns or pubs) are legally restricted to selling only beer, and possibly wine or cider. Liquor bars, also simply called bars, also sell hard liquor.

Bars are sometimes exempt from smoking bans that restaurants are subject to, even if those restaurants have liquor licenses. The distinction between a restaurant that serves liquor and a bar is usually made by the percentage of revenue earned from selling liquor, although increasingly, smoking bans include bars as well.

In most places, bars are prohibited from selling alcoholic beverages to go, and this makes them clearly different from liquor stores. Some brewpubs and wineries can serve alcohol to go, but under the rules applied to a liquor store. In some areas, such as New Orleans and parts of Las Vegas and Savannah, Georgia, open containers of alcohol may be prepared to go. This kind of restriction is usually dependent on an open container law. In Pennsylvania and Ohio, bars may sell six-packs of beer "to-go" in original (sealed) containers by obtaining a take-out license. New Jersey permits all forms of packaged goods to be sold at bars, and permits packaged beer and wine to be sold at any time on-premises sales of alcoholic beverages are allowed.

During the 19th century, drinking establishments were called saloons. In the American Old West the most popular establishment in town was usually the Western saloon. Many of these Western saloons survive, though their services and features have changed with the times. Newer establishments have sometimes been built in Western saloon style for a nostalgic effect. In American cities there were also numerous saloons, which allowed only male patrons and were usually owned by one of the major breweries. Drunkenness, fights, and alcoholism made the saloon into a powerful symbol of all that was wrong with alcohol. Saloons were the primary target of the Temperance movement, and the Anti-Saloon League, founded in 1892, was the most powerful lobby in favor of Prohibition. When Prohibition was repealed, President Franklin D. Roosevelt asked the states not to permit the return of saloons.

Many Irish- or British-themed "pubs" exist throughout United States and Canada and in some continental European countries.

As of May, 2014, Pittsburgh, Pennsylvania had the most bars per capita in the United States.

Former Yugoslavia

In Bosnia and Herzegovina, Croatia, Montenegro and Serbia, modern bars overlap with coffeehouses and larger ones are sometimes also nightclubs. Since the 1980s, they have become similar in social function to the bars of Italy, Spain and Greece, as meeting places for people in a city.

Gallery

In fiction

Bars are a popular setting for fictional works, and in many cases, authors and other creators have developed imaginary bar locations that have become notable, such as the bar for Cheers, Cocktails and Dreams bar in the film Cocktail (1988), the Copacabana bar in the crime film Goodfellas, the rough and tumble Double Deuce in Road House (1989), The Kit Kat Klub in Cabaret, the Korova Milk Bar in the dystopian novel and film adaptation of A Clockwork Orange, the Mos Eisley cantina-bar in Star Wars Episode IV: A New Hope (1977), and the Steinway Beer Garden from the crime-themed video game Grand Theft Auto IV.

See also

 Alcohol-free bar
 Beer garden
 Cellarette (liquor cabinet)
 Dive bar
 Drinking culture
 Honky-tonk
 Hostess bar
 Izakaya
 Juke joint
 Last call
 List of bartenders
 List of public house topics
 Pub
 Shebeen
 Speakeasy
 Tavern
 Tiki bar
 Western saloon

References

Bibliography

   A humorous account of the drinking culture of Madison Avenue advertising executives during the 1960s. Originally published in 1962 as The 24-Hour Drink Book: A Guide to Executive Survival.

External links

Bar Database

Types of drinking establishment
Bartending
Restaurants by type